91st Street–Beverly Hills is one of five Metra stations within the Beverly Hills neighborhood of Chicago, Illinois, along the Beverly Branch of the Rock Island District Line. It is located at 9105 South Prospect Square near 91st Street,  from LaSalle Street Station, the northern terminus of the line. In Metra's zone-based fare system, 91st Street is in zone C. As of 2018, 91st Street–Beverly Hills is the 128th busiest of Metra's 236 non-downtown stations, with an average of 368 weekday boardings.

As of 2022, 91st Street–Beverly Hills is served by 20 trains in each direction on weekdays, by 10 inbound trains and 11 outbound trains on Saturdays, and by eight trains in each direction on Sundays.

Despite the location and the name of the station, parking is not available along 91st Street nor Prospect Square. There is a parking lot north of the intersection with 91st and Prospect Square that includes an additional one for a Forest Preserve Maintenance Facility. The closest parking lots to the station house are on-street parking along Beverly Avenue and a parking lot along the west side of Beverly Avenue between the end of the on-street parking lots and north of 92nd Place. This lot is on the right of way of the former Pennsylvania Railroad "Panhandle Line" that shared the station. No bus connections are available.

References

External links

1993 Image of Beverly Hills - 91st Street Station (Metra Rail Photos)
Station from 91st Street from Google Maps Street View

Metra stations in Chicago
Former Chicago, Rock Island and Pacific Railroad stations